Ivory Tower is a 2014 American documentary film written, directed and produced by Andrew Rossi. The film premiered in competition category of U.S. Documentary Competition program at the 2014 Sundance Film Festival on January 18, 2014.

After its premiere at Sundance Film Festival, Participant Media, Paramount Pictures and Samuel Goldwyn Films acquired distribution rights of the film. The film had a theatrical release on June 13, 2014 in United States by Samuel Goldwyn Films. Paramount Pictures will handle the international release of the film, while Participant Media will handle the campaign for film's theatrical release.  The film was first broadcast on CNN on November 20, 2014.

Synopsis
The film questions the value of higher education in an era when the price of college has increased more than any other service in the United States. It explores the different types of higher education around the nation. These include: community colleges, four year universities, vocational schools, online courses, and less traditional forms of education. The film argues that the high cost of tuition is at a breaking point.

Reception
The film was named one of the best documentaries of 2014 by Indiewire. Frank Bruni of The New York Times called the film "an astonishingly thorough tour of the university landscape." Matt Goldberg in his review for Collider said that "Ivory Tower almost seems ambivalent about the college crisis, but it’s never cold or emotionless." Todd McCarthy of The Hollywood Reporter gave the film a positive review, calling it "a stimulating and upsetting look at how high tuition and huge student loans have created a perfect storm over American colleges."

References

External links
  – official site
 
 

2014 films
American documentary films
2014 documentary films
Documentary films about education in the United States
Paramount Pictures films
Films directed by Andrew Rossi
Higher education in the United States
Samuel Goldwyn Films films
CNN Films films
2010s English-language films
2010s American films